Kutiyana is one of the 182 Legislative Assembly constituencies of Gujarat state in India. It is part of Porbandar district.

List of segments
This assembly seat represents the following segments,

 Kutiyana Taluka
 Ranavav Taluka
 Porbandar Taluka (Part) Villages – Ratanpar, Oddar, Tukda Gosa, Keshod (Lushala), Erada, Delodar, Mitrala, Rajpar, Gosa, Chikasa, Bhad, Garej, Navi Bandar, Ratiya, Untada, Balej, Kadachh, Mocha, Gorsar, Mander, Chingariya, Pata, Madhavpur

Members of Legislative Assembly

Election results

2022

2017

2012

2007

See also
 List of constituencies of the Gujarat Legislative Assembly
 Gujarat Legislative Assembly

References

External links
 

Assembly constituencies of Gujarat
Porbandar district